The  is the office of the prosecution, in some countries, responsible for presenting legal cases at criminal trials against individuals or parties accused of breaking the law.

Office
The word literally means "wooden floor"; this is because, as opposed to the judges, who sit on an elevated platform during trials, the prosecution pleads standing on the floor. This also explains why the judges are sometimes referred to as "sitting magistrates" or "magistrates of the bench" while the prosecutors are sometimes referred to as "standing magistrates".

In Brazil, the prosecutor's office, the "Public Ministry", is metonymically referred to as the parquet.

See also
 Prosecutor
 Public prosecutor's office
 Prosecution Ministry

References

French words and phrases
French legal terminology
Romanian legal terminology